Scott Peters may refer to:

 Scott Peters (American football) (born 1978), offensive lineman for the Arizona Cardinals
 Scott Peters (musician), musician with the Canadian folk rock band Captain Tractor
 Scott Peters (politician) (born 1958), U.S. Congressman from San Diego
 Scott Peters (writer), Canadian television producer, television director and screenwriter